Desulfatibacillum  is a bacteria genus from the order Desulfobacterales.

See also
 Desulfatibacillum alkenivorans AK-01

References

Further reading 
 
 

Desulfobacterales
Bacteria genera